Maatsen is a Dutch surname. Notable people with the surname include:

Dalian Maatsen (born 1994), Dutch footballer
Darren Maatsen (born 1991), Dutch footballer
Ian Maatsen (born 2002), Dutch footballer

Dutch-language surnames